Zeynalov is a surname. Notable people with the surname include:

Eldaniz Zeynalov (1927–2001), Azerbaijani actor
Mahir Zeynalov (born 1970), Azerbaijani journalist
Marif Zeynalov (born 1934), Azerbaijani geologist
Ruslan Zeynalov (born 1982), Ukrainian footballer
Zeynal Zeynalov (footballer) (born 1979), Azerbaijani footballer
Zeynal Zeynalov (1876-1935), Azerbaijani politician of Talysh descent